Woland is an upcoming film based on Mikhail Bulgakov's novel The Master and Margarita, starring August Diehl and directed by Michael Lockshin . 

Release is currently scheduled for end of 2023.

Premise
Moscow, 1930s. 

A prominent writer in Moscow, finds himself at the center of a literary scandal. His works are censored by the Soviet state and are no longer being staged in the theater. His colleagues actively avoid him, and in days he turns into an outcast, kicked out of the writer's union and with no means to survive. 

Soon afterwards he meets Margarita. Revived by her love and support, the writer begins working on a new novel, where all the characters are people he has met in real life. The protagonist of the book is Woland - a mystical dark force who visits Moscow to wreck havoc and take revenge on all those who helped cause the writer's downfall.  The writer's inspiration for Woland is a chance foreign traveler to the Soviet Union. 

As the Master sinks himself deeper and deeper into his work, and the state around him becomes evermore totalitarian - he gradually stops noticing as the border between reality and his imagination begins to fade.

Cast

Main cast
 August Diehl as Woland, the Devil who visits to Moscow
 Yevgeny Tsyganov as Тhe Master, a writer desperate to survive
 Yuliya Snigir as Margarita, the Master's lover
 Claes Bang as Pontius Pilate
 Yuri Kolokolnikov as Korovyev, Woland's right-hand man
 Aleksey Rozin as Azazello, a sharpshooter in Woland's suite
 Polina Aug as Hella, a vampire in Woland's suite
Behemoth will be created using CGI, while his "reality" version will be played by a Maine Coon named Kyesha. His voice is as of November 16, 2021, unknown.

Secondary roles
 Leonid Yarmolnik as Doctor Stravinsky,  director of the insane asylum
 Igor Vernik as Bengalsky, one of the guests at Woland's show of black magic
 Marat Basharov as Likhodeyev,   director of the Théâtre des Variétés
 Aleksei Guskov as Baron Maigel,  the sacrifice
 Yevgeny Knyazev as Berlioz,  director of the organization MASSOLIT (Mass Socialist Literature) and Homeless' acquaintance 
 Danil Steklov as poet Bezdomny (Homeless),  a naive young poet that Woland first meets in Moscow, 
 Aleksandr Yatsenko as Aloisy Mogarych, a journalist friend of the Writer
 Dmitriy Lysenkov as Latunsky, one of the critics who destroys the Writer's career
 Pavel Vorozhtsov as Varenukha,  administrator of the  Variety Theater
 Valery Kukhareshin as Rimsky, financial director of the Variety Theater

Production
In 2018, the film was announced as being in production, with 3 major Russian producers helming the project: Ruben Dishdishyan, Igor Tolstunov, and Leonard Blavatnik. Russian film director Nikolai Lebedev was set to direct. By 2020, however, the project still had not taken off. At some point in the project, Lebedev had left the project.

Instead, Michael Lockshin, director of The Silver Skates co-wrote a new script with Roman Kantor in 2020 and directed the film in 2021. The new script intertwined the novel with Bulgakov's life. 

In July 2021, August Diehl was confirmed to join the film as Woland.

Filming began in July 2021 in Moscow, St. Petersburg, and Malta, and concluded in October 2021.

Mars Media announced that the film would be released on January 1, 2023, with Universal Pictures acting as distributor.

In August 2022, it was announced that the release date would be pushed to late 2023, due to Universal Pictures leaving Russia over the 2022 Russian invasion of Ukraine and problems with funding the film's post-production.

References

External links 
 

Upcoming films
2023 fantasy films
2023 drama films
Films based on The Master and Margarita
Upcoming Russian-language films
Film productions suspended due to the COVID-19 pandemic
Films set in Moscow
Russian fantasy films
Russian fantasy drama films